Knave  magazine was a long-running British adult magazine featuring softcore pornography, published by Galaxy Publications Limited. Originally launched in 1968 by the photographer Russell Gay, it was the upmarket sister publication of Fiesta magazine. Mary Millington modelled for the magazine in 1974, prior to her exclusive signing to work for David Sullivan's magazines.

Along with many other adult magazines, Knave has published the works of popular authors, including Kim Newman, Dave Langford, and Neil Gaiman. The first issue featured a short story by Ellery Queen.

The surrealist artist Penny Slinger appeared in Knave in 1973 in a photoshoot and interview in which she posed nude with her own artwork. The artist and musician Cosey Fanni Tutti appeared as a Knave model in 1977, as part of an art project exploring pornography in which she appeared as a model in a number of pornographic magazines.

Neil Gaiman's early short stories, including "We Can Get Them for You Wholesale", were published within the magazine; he also worked at the magazine in many roles, including celebrity interviewer and book reviewer. Gaiman began work at the magazine in 1984 but left in the late 80s because an editorial change resulted in the magazine concentrating more heavily on pornographic content.

Eric Fuller, credited by The Guardian as "the man behind the success of Dennis Publishing's lad-mag, Maxim", also worked for the magazine for a time.

Knave ceased production in 2015, after 47 years of publication.

See also
 List of pornographic magazines
 Outline of British pornography
 Pornography in the United Kingdom

Notes and references

Men's magazines published in the United Kingdom
Pornographic magazines published in the United Kingdom
Magazines established in 1968
Magazines disestablished in 2015
1968 establishments in the United Kingdom
2015 disestablishments in the United Kingdom